E7600 may refer to:
 Nikon Coolpix 7600, a digital camera
 Intel Core 2 Duo E7600 "Wolfdale-3M", a central processor